Jack Colman is a British author. His debut novel The Rule was released in 2015.

Personal 

Jack Colman was born in 1987. He grew up one of five children on a rural smallholding in the middle of the North Yorkshire Moors. His first job was picking potatoes on the local farms and he has since been an antique furniture restorer, a grain tester, a plasterer’s mate, a football coach and a corporate lawyer. He is married and lives with his wife in Poland.

The Rule

Colman says that the idea for his novel came as he was attending a lecture at King's College, London where the lecturer made a comment on how past societies could have been governed with just one rule. Colman worked on the idea and book while studying and working as a corporate lawyer in London. He then submitted it to HarperVoyager's open submission process for sci-fi and fantasy. 15 books were selected from 5,000 entries, including The Rule.

The Rule is set in a Viking kingdom called Hellvik. It will be released on e-book 26 March 2015 and on paperback in October 2015.

References

1987 births
Living people
People from Ryedale (district)
Writers from Yorkshire